Teleiodes vulgella (common groundling) is a moth of the family Gelechiidae. It is known from most of Europe, east to the southern Ural and the Volga region.

The wingspan is 11–14 mm. The head is grey, face whitish. Terminal joint of palpi as long as second. Forewings grey, irrorated with darker and some black scales; indistinct blackish spots on costa near base and before and beyond middle; sometimes two black dots transversely placed in disc at 1/4; stigmata black, first discal above plical, second confluent with a blackish bar of raised scales from tornus [small blackish patches bordered by raised whitish scale-tufts]. Hindwings 1, rather dark grey. The larva is greenish-grey; dots black; head ochreous-brown; plate of 2 black, bisected  

They are on wing from June to July.

The larva feeds on various shrubs and trees, including Crataegus, Prunus spinosa, Cotoneaster horizontalis, Juniperus communis, Malus domestica, Malus sylvestris, Prunus domestica, Amelanchier, Pyrus communis, Sorbus aria and Sorbus aucuparia.

References

Moths described in 1775
Teleiodes
Moths of Japan
Moths of Europe
Insects of Turkey